Coleophora loxodon is a moth of the family Coleophoridae. It is found in the Crimean Peninsula.

References

loxodon
Moths of Europe